The Angola national roller hockey team is the national team side of Angola at international roller hockey. Usually is part of FIRS Roller Hockey World Cup.

Angola squad - 2015 FIRS Men's Roller Hockey World Cup

Team Staff
 General Manager: Faustino Casemiro
 Mechanic: José Quiteque
 Doctor: Valdemiro Diogo	
 Physio: Nelson Cardoso 	

Coaching Staff
 Head Coach: Orlando Graça

Titles
African Championship: (1)
2019

Past squads

Angola squad - 64th Nations Cup

References

External links
Hoquei Angolano

National Roller Hockey Team
Roller hockey
National roller hockey (quad) teams